Jean-Pierre Mertl (23 April 1930 – 31 October 2012) was a Luxembourgian footballer. A defender, he played for the Luxembourg national football team and two club sides.

Club career 

Mertl began playing for Rumelange in 1951 before moving to Union Luxembourg in 1956. There he won one Luxembourg National Division title and three Luxembourg Cups.

International career 

Mertl first played for Luxembourg in 1951 in a defeat against West Germany. He went on to appear 20 times for Luxembourg and scored one goal in his international career in a match against a Portugal B-team.

Honours
Luxembourg National Division: 1
 1961–62

Luxembourg Cup: 3
 1958–59, 1962–63, 1963–64

References

1930 births
2012 deaths
Luxembourgian footballers
Luxembourg international footballers
Association football defenders